The Rubi River is a left tributary of the Itimbiri River, which forms where the Rubi joins the Likati River.

Course

The Rubi River originates in the southeast of the Bas-Uélé province, then flows west until it meets the Likati near Djamba.
The town of Buta is on the north bank of its central section.
The Rubi crosses the Poko, Bambesa, Buta and Aketi territories.
The Itimbiri is formed by the confluence of the Rubi River and the Likati River.
The largest tributaries of the Itimbiri-Rubi are the Likati, Aketi and Tele.

The Domaine de chasse de Rubi-Tele (Rubi-Tele Hunting Domain) was created between the Rubi and Tele rivers in 1930, and modified in 1932. 
It is one of the first protected areas in the DRC.
The status is not clear, but some see it as an area where all hunting is prohibited, which feeds neighboring hunting areas.

Notes

Citations

Sources

Rivers of the Democratic Republic of the Congo